Reinado Internacional del Café 2009, was held in Manizales, Colombia, on January 10, 2009. 21 contestants attended the event. The winner was Alejandra Mesa Estrada, from Colombia.

Results

Placements

Special awards
 Queen of Water: Venezuela
 Queen of Police: Venezuela
 Best Face: Spain
 Best Body: Colombia

Official delegates

References

External links
 Instituto de Cultura y Turismo de Manizales
 Alcaldía de Manizales
 REINADO INTERNACIONAL DEL CAFE
 Jimmys Pageant Page

2009
2009 beauty pageants
2009 in Colombia